Edgar Omer Campbell (September 12, 1867 - December 31, 1947) served in the California State Assembly for the 59th district from 1925 to 1927 and during World War I he served in the United States Army.

References

External links

United States Army personnel of World War I
19th-century American politicians
Republican Party members of the California State Assembly
1867 births
1947 deaths
People from Carrollton, Illinois